Luk Yeung Galleria, formally known as Luk Yeung Sun Chuen Mall, is one of the largest shopping centres in Tsuen Wan, New Territories, Hong Kong, located in Luk Yeung Sun Chuen, above MTR Tsuen Wan station.

It was developed in 1983 by a consortium of property developers, including MTR Corporation, Hong Kong Land, Jardine Matheson Holdings and Kiu Kwong.

Location
Luk Yeung Galleria has direct access from the MTR Tsuen Wan station and footbridges connecting major shopping centres in Tsuen Wan and a bus interchange, which brings large numbers of people to the shopping centre.

References

External links

 

Shopping centres in Hong Kong
Tsuen Wan
MTR Corporation
Hongkong Land
Jardine Matheson Group
Buildings and structures completed in 1983
Shopping malls established in 1983
1983 establishments in Hong Kong